Frederick Vaughn "Fred" Newhouse (born November 8, 1948) is an American retired sprinter. He won a gold medal in the 4×400 meter relay and an individual silver in the 400 m, both at the 1971 Pan American Games and at the 1976 Olympics. His individual time of 44.40 seconds at the Olympics was the second fastest time of the 1970s.

Newhouse was one of the organizers of the Northwest Flyers Track Club in Houston, Texas.  He graduated from Galilee High School in Hallsville, Texas.  After graduating Prairie View A&M with a degree in electrical engineering, he received his master's degree in international business.  He now is director of public affairs for Valero Energy and serves as the assistant treasurer of the Prairie View A&M Foundation.

Newhouse lives in Houston.  After graduating, he was accepted into Prairie View A&M University in Texas and the University of Washington in Seattle, earning his degrees in electrical engineering and masters of international business. He served two years in the United States Army in between his undergraduate and graduate. After graduation he worked as an engineer with the Exxon in Baton Rouge.

In his life, Newhouse has volunteered for the boards of directors for United States Olympic Committee and USA Track and Field.  He is one of the past chairmen of the board of the Texas City/ LaMarque Chamber of Commerce, chair-elect for the Houston East End Chamber of Commerce, chairman of Houston's Community Family Center, and vice-chair of the Black Heritage Committee – Houston Livestock Show and Rodeo. Newhouse serves on the Capital Campaign Committee for Prairie View A&M University. As well is an supporter of the United Way and Boy Scouts of America. While being a part of Prairie View A&M, Newhouse became a three-time All-American and National Champion in the sport Track and Field.  In 1976, he won Gold and Silver Medals participating in the Montreal Canada Olympic Games.  By 2000, Newhouse was appointed team leader for the United States Men's Track and Field squad going to the Olympic Games in Sydney, Australia.  He lives on to ref for the Texas Relays and the Texas State UIL Track and Field Championships.

Newhouse was inducted into the Texas Track and Field Coaches Hall of Fame, Class of 2014.

References

External links

 
 Litsky, Frank (July 29, 1976) A Cuban Runner Smokes the Field. New York Times
 

1948 births
Living people
People from Honey Grove, Texas
Track and field athletes from Texas
American male sprinters
Athletes (track and field) at the 1976 Summer Olympics
Olympic gold medalists for the United States in track and field
Olympic silver medalists for the United States in track and field
Athletes (track and field) at the 1971 Pan American Games
Medalists at the 1976 Summer Olympics
Pan American Games gold medalists for the United States
Pan American Games medalists in athletics (track and field)
Medalists at the 1971 Pan American Games